Red T is a 501(c)(3) nonprofit organization devoted to the protection of translators and interpreters in conflict zones and other high-risk settings.

Based in New York, NY it was founded by Maya Hess.

It has joined forces with AIIC, IAPTI and FIT in an effort to put pressure on governments to ensure the long-term safety of linguists who served their troops in Afghanistan.

References

External links
Official Website
Difference Between Translation & Localization

Translation organizations
Professional associations based in the United States